Henson is a surname and a given name. Notable people with the name include:

Surname
 Adam Henson (born 1966), British television presenter
 Ant Henson (born 1989), British singer-songwriter
 Basil Henson (1918–1990), British actor
 Bill Henson (born 1955), Australian photographer
 Brian Henson (born 1963), American puppeteer, director, and producer
 Christian Henson (born 1971), British composer
 David Henson (born 1984), British athlete
 Deborah Henson-Conant (born 1953), American harpist
 Dinah Henson (1948–2020), English amateur golfer
 Drew Henson (born 1980), former Major League Baseball player and American football quarterback
 Elden Henson (born 1977), American actor
 Gavin Henson (born 1982), Welsh rugby union player, son of Alan Henson
 Gladys Henson (1897–1982), British actress
 Herbert Hensley Henson (1863–1947), British bishop
 Jane Henson (1934–2013), American puppeteer, wife of Jim Henson
 Jim Henson (1936–1990), American puppeteer and creator of the Muppets, as well as the organizations below that bear his name
 Jim Henson (escaped slave), American slave who escaped and settled in Canada
 Joe Henson (1932–2015), British conservationist
 John Henson (born 1967), American TV show host
 John Henson (puppeteer) (1965–2014), American puppeteer, son of Jim Henson
 Josiah Henson (1789–1883), famed fugitive American slave
 Josh Henson (born 1975), American football coach
 Keith Henson (born 1942), American science and science-fiction writer and activist against the Church of Scientology
 Leslie Henson (1891–1957), British actor
 Lisa Henson (born 1960), American television and movie producer
 Lou Henson (1932–2020), American college basketball coach
 Martin Henson (born 1954), British computer scientist
 Matthew Henson (1866–1955), an American explorer who may have been the first to reach the geographic North Pole with Robert Peary in 1909
 Mishavonna Henson, American Idol contestant
 Mickie Henson (1963-2022), American professional wrestling referee
 Nicky Henson (1945–2019), British actor, son of Leslie Henson
 Richard A. Henson (1910-2002), an American test pilot, flight school operator, and founder of the modern "commuter airline" concept
 Shandelle Henson (born 1964), American mathematician
 Taraji P. Henson (born 1970), American actress and singer
 Tim Henson (born 1980), American host of popular podcast Distorted View Daily
 William Henson (Australian politician) (1826–1903), New South Wales politician
 William Samuel Henson (1812–1888), British aviation pioneer

Given name
 Henson P. Barnes (1934–2015), American politician
 Henson Cargill (1941–2007), American country music singer
 Henson Moore (born 1939), American politician

See also
 Hanson (surname)

English-language surnames
Patronymic surnames
Surnames from given names